FC Avanhard Zhydachiv was an amateur Ukrainian football club from Zhydachiv, Lviv Oblast.

League and cup history

{|class="wikitable"
|-bgcolor="#efefef"
! Season
! Div.
! Pos.
! Pl.
! W
! D
! L
! GS
! GA
! P
!Domestic Cup
!colspan=2|Europe
!Notes
|-
|align=center|1992–93
|align=center|3rd "lower"
|align=center|8
|align=center|34
|align=center|13
|align=center|10
|align=center|11
|align=center|41
|align=center|32
|align=center|36
|align=center|
|align=center|
|align=center|
|align=center|
|-
|align=center|1993–94
|align=center|3rd "lower"
|align=center|10
|align=center|34
|align=center|12
|align=center|9
|align=center|13
|align=center|38
|align=center|44
|align=center|33
|align=center|
|align=center|
|align=center|
|align=center|
|-
|align=center|1994–95
|align=center|3rd "lower"
|align=center|16
|align=center|42
|align=center|14
|align=center|9
|align=center|19
|align=center|42
|align=center|65
|align=center|51
|align=center|
|align=center|
|align=center|
|align=center|
|-
|align=center|1995–96
|align=center|3rd
|align=center|11
|align=center|40
|align=center|18
|align=center|8
|align=center|14
|align=center|44
|align=center|44
|align=center|62
|align=center|
|align=center|
|align=center|
|align=center bgcolor=lightgrey|withdrew
|}

See also
FC Medyk Morshyn
FC Skala Morshyn

 
Amateur football clubs in Ukraine
Football clubs in Lviv Oblast
Sport in Zhydachiv
Association football clubs established in 1951
1951 establishments in Ukraine